Nemanjić family tree

Monarchs

Full list

Vukan / Uroš I
Zavida, Prince of Zachumlia before 1145
Tihomir, Grand Prince of Serbia 1163-1166
Stracimir, Prince of West Morava 1163-after 1180s
Miroslav, Prince of Hum 1163–1190
Toljen, Prince of Hum 1192–1196
Petar
Nikola
Vladislav
Boriša
Toljen II
Petar
Bajko
Andrija, Prince of Hum
Bogdan
Tvrtko
Bogdan
Tvrtko
Đorđe
Radoslav, Prince of Hum 1249-1254
Vukosava
Andrija
Petar
Slava
Dragoslava
Petar, Count of Split 1222–1225
Stefan Nemanja, Grand Prince of Serbia 1166-1196
Vukan II Nemanjić, Grand Prince of Serbia 1202-1204 and titular King of Duklja 1186-1208
Đorđe/Đurađ, titular King of Zeta 1208-1217
Stefan, builder  of Morača monastery
Kostadin
Vasoje
Stefan
Kostadin II
Dmitar/Dimitrije, Saint David, clergyman, builder of Davidovica monastery
Vratislav, Grand Župan
Vratko
Nikola
Milica, married Prince Lazar Hrebeljanović of Serbia 1371-1389
...see Lazarević dynasty:
Mara, married Lord Vuk Branković
...see Branković dynasty:
Đurađ I Branković, Prince of Serbia
Lazar II Branković, Prince of Serbia
Stefan III Branković, Prince of Serbia
Stefan Visoki, Prince
Vuk
Mara Dragana, married Tsar Ivan Shishman of Bulgaria
Teodora, married Nicholas II Garai, Palatine of Hungary
Jelena, married firstly Đurađ II Stracimirović Balšić. Lord of Zeta; married secondly Sandalj Hranić-Kosača, Grand Duke of Bosnia
Balša III Balšić
Olivera Despina Hatun, married Sultan Bayezid I
Vladin (Bladinus)
Stefan II Nemanjić the First-Crowned, King of Serbia
Stefan Radoslav
Komnina
Stefan Vladislav I
Stefan
Desa
Unknown Daughter
Predislav (Sveti Sava II)
Stefan Uroš I, King of Serbia
Stefan Dragutin
Elizabeth (Married Stjepan I Kotromanić of Bosnia)
Mary
Jadwiga (Hedwig)
Unknown Son
Katarina
Marija
Unknown Daughter
Stefan Vladislav II
Urošic
Stefan Uroš II Milutin, King of Serbia
Stefan Uroš II Dečanski, King of Serbia
Stefan Uroš IV Dušan, King of Serbia (1331–1346) and Tsar of All Serbs and Greeks (1346–1355)
Stefan Uroš V, Tsar
Dušman (Dušica)
Simeon (Siniša) Uroš
Jovan Uroš
Unknown Daughter
Marija Angelina Dukaina
Irina
Unknown Son
Stefan Duka
Jelena (Married Mladen III Šubić)
Teodora, married Sebastokrator Dejan Dragaš, member of the Dejanović noble family
Ana-Neda (Dominika) (Married Mihail Asen III (Mihail Šišman), Tsar of Bulgaria)
Ivan Stefan, Tsar of Bulgaria (1330–1331)
Mihail
Šišman
Carica Zorica, engaged to Charles II, Count of Alençon
Konstantin
Brnča
Stefan
Rastko (Sava), the first Serbian Archbishop 1217-1233 and founder of the Serbian Church
Unknown Daughter
Unknown Daughter
Konstantin Tih Asen, Tsar of Bulgaria
Mihail Asen II, Tsar of Bulgaria

Family trees
Dynasty genealogy